The Kent Coast Line is the railway line that runs from Minster East Jn to Buckland Jn connecting Ramsgate and Dover Priory in the English county of Kent.

It was electrified (750 V DC third rail) by BR under the 1955 Modernisation Plan.

Services 
Services are operated by SE Trains using class 375 units. Some peak trains use  or are High Speed 1 services to or from London St. Pancras or the Class 465/466 Networkers are also used in the Peak Hours or in the summer timetable services from London Cannon Street extended to Ramsgate via Greenwich, Woolwich Arsenal and Dartford.

This service was ended after the COVID pandemic massively reduced rail use.

History 

The South Eastern Railway's (SER) first main line went to Dover via Folkestone and Ashford. The SER Ashford to Margate Broadstairs and Ramsgate (via Canterbury West) line was then extended south to Deal. In 1881 this was linked up by the "Dover & Deal Joint Railway" with their bitter rival the London, Chatham and Dover Railway (LCDR).

Upon the joint management of the SER and LCDR in 1899 the track layout at Ashford rationalised, with Thanet receiving similar treatment (by Southern) in the 1920s.

The line was electrified under the BR 1955 Modernisation Plan, in "Kent Coast Electrification (Stage 2)" opening January 1961.

The building of the railway was significant in the development of seaside resorts like Broadstairs.

Dover track layout 

The Railway Clearing House produced a map that shows the complex layout of this area.  This shows the separate connection to the pier where trains used to board ferries.

References 

Rail transport in Kent
Railway lines in South East England